Laurenz Dehl (born 12 December 2001) is a German professional footballer who plays as a midfielder for Viktoria Berlin on loan from the  club Union Berlin.

Career
Born in Berlin, Dehl played youth football for SV Blau-Gelb Berlin before joining the academy of Union Berlin in 2011. He progressed through their academy and signed a two-year professional contract in summer 2019. He joined 3. Liga side Hallescher FC on a season-long loan in July 2020. He made his senior debut on 20 September 2020 as a substitute in a 2–0 victory away to 1. FC Magdeburg. He scored his first professional goal on 21 October 2020 with the opening goal of a 4–1 win over SV Meppen. He received the first red card of his career on 12 December 2020 after picking up a second yellow card for preventing Dynamo Dresden from taking a quick throw-in. He scored 3 goals in 22 appearances across the 2020–21 season.

Dehl made his debut for Union on 26 August 2021, as a substitute in a 0–0 Europa Conference League draw with Kuopion PS, in what turned out to be his only appearance of the season. On 2 December 2021, Union announced Dehl had to undergo surgery for an injury he picked up. In April 2022, Union extended Dehl's expiring contract.

On 25 July 2022, Dehl joined Bohemians in Ireland on loan until the end of the season in November 2022. He made just 1 appearance during his time in Ireland, playing the first 45 minutes of a 1–0 loss at home to Dundalk on 12 August 2022.

On 4 January 2023, Dehl was loaned to Viktoria Berlin.

Style of play
Having started his career as an attacking midfielder, he retrained as a right-back during the 2021–22 season according to Union managing director Oliver Ruhnert.

Career statistics

References

External links
 
 

2001 births
Footballers from Berlin
21st-century German people
Living people
German footballers
Association football midfielders
1. FC Union Berlin players
Hallescher FC players
Bohemian F.C. players
FC Viktoria 1889 Berlin players
3. Liga players
League of Ireland players
Regionalliga players
German expatriate footballers
Expatriate association footballers in the Republic of Ireland
German expatriate sportspeople in Ireland